Rathjen is a surname. Notable people with the surname include:

Deborah Rathjen, Australian scientist
Peter Rathjen (born 1964), Australian scientist and medical researcher
Uwe Rathjen (born 1943), West German handball player
Tobias Rathjen, a German murderer; he is responsible for the Hanau shootings